
Canedo may refer to:

Places

Civil parish
 Canedo (Santa Maria da Feira)
 Canedo (Ribeira de Pena)
 Canedo (Vale e Vila Maior)

Municipality
 Senador Canedo

People
Canedo or Cañedo is a toponymic surname. Notable people with the surname include:

 Alexander Cañedo (1902–1978), Mexican-American artist
 Beatriz Canedo Patiño (1950–2016), Bolivian fashion designer
 Caio Canedo Corrêa (born 1990), Brazilian footballer
 Carlos Cañedo (born 1975), Mexican-American musician, dancer, choreographer, and documentary producer
 Enrique Díez Canedo (1879–1944), Spanish postmodernist poet, translator, and literary critic.
 Francisco del Río y Cañedo (1899–1963), Cuban-Mexican ambassador
 Guillermo Díez-Canedo (born 1982), Spanish slalom canoeist
 Guillermo Cañedo Malburg (born 1986), Mexican sports executive 
 Juan de Dios Cañedo (1786–1850), Mexican statesman.
 Ken Canedo (born 1953), Filipino-American musician, composer and author
 Sara Guadalupe Figueroa Canedo (born 1956), Mexican politician
 Rafael Cañedo Benítez (1942–2001), Mexican businessman and politician 
 Robert Cañedo (born 1984), Filipino footballer
 Roberto Cañedo (1918–1998), Mexican actor

Other uses
 Canedo F.C., a Portuguese football club